Scrobipalpula sacculicola is a moth in the family Gelechiidae. It was described by Annette Frances Braun in 1925. It is found in North America, where it has been recorded from Colorado, Ohio and Oklahoma.

References

Scrobipalpula
Moths described in 1925